Rathbraughan is a townland in County Sligo, Ireland just north of Sligo Town.  It gives its name to Rathbraughan Line, the main road through the area, and to Rathbraughan Park, a housing estate on the northern edge of Sligo Town which was built in the 1980s.

See also
 List of towns in the Republic of Ireland

Townlands of County Sligo